Softshell,  soft-shell, Soft Shell or variants may refer to:
Trionychidae or soft-shell turtle
Soft-shell crab
Soft shell, a weather-resistant outer clothing layer
Soft Shell, Kentucky

See also 
 Softshell turtle (disambiguation)